Andreas Bolek (3 May 1894 in Weinbergen near Lemberg – 5 May 1945 in Magdeburg) was an Austrian politician and a leader in the Nazi Party (NSDAP).

In 1914 he went as an Austrian volunteer in the First World War. In 1919 he returned to Linz, where he married and later had four daughters. In 1923 he took a job at the Linz "Electricity and Streetcar Company (ESG). In the same year he also joined the Nazi party, and as a former combat officer he could soon be promoted to a local SA leader.

After the Austrian National Socialists in 1926 mainly assumed the leadership of Adolf Hitler, Bolek was designated as the Deputy "Gauleiter" of Upper Austria. When Alfred Proksch, the Gauleiter, was appointed in 1927 as Deputy Country Director, Bolek was promoted to the top of the regional administration. In 1932 he was Chairman of NS Group, the Council of the City of Linz, but in the following year, the Nazi party was banned by the Austrian government. Bolek set off across the German border and began working out of Munich and Passau. While Bolek first resided in Hacklberg at the Danube, he also agitated masses along the Inn River.  

In the same year he was naturalized in the German Reich. In March 1936 he became a Reichstag representative for the constituency of  Hessen. A year later he joined the SS and was a SS-Brigade leader. On 1 December 1937 he was entrusted with the management of the body of the police chief of Magdeburg, a position which from 7 November 1938 fully occupied. He has been appointed yet to SS leaders in the SD main office and in 1939 he became an honorary member of the People's Court for a period of 5 years. In 1942 he was appointed to a SS-group leader with high honors from the Nazis.

In April 1945, the Allies occupied Magdeburg on the western banks of the Elbe on 5 May 1945, Soviet troops invaded in Magdeburg on the eastern bank of the Elbe, whereupon Andreas Bolek was shot.

Literature 
NS-apologetisch: Karl Höffkes:  Hitlers politische Generale. Die Gauleiter des 3. Reiches; ein biographisches Nachschlagewerk. Grabert-Verlag, Tübingen 1997, .

References

Austro-Hungarian military personnel of World War I 
Austrian politicians
Nazi Party officials
1894 births
1945 deaths
Politicians from Lviv
Austrian Nazis
Austrian emigrants to Germany
Nazis executed by the Soviet Union by firearm
Nazi leaders assassinated by the Allies
Members of the Reichstag of Nazi Germany
Judges in the Nazi Party